RusPetro is an independent oil and gas producer operating in the central portion of the Krasnoleninsk field in Western Siberia. It was listed on the London Stock Exchange until its privatisation in June 2016.

History
The company was founded by Vladimir Marchenk in Cyprus in 2007 and was subsequently known as Petroltech Holdings until June 2011 when it became RusPetro Holdings. It made its initial public offering in January 2012. It was de-listed from the London Stock Exchange in June 2016.

Operations
The company has recently completed a well in the Krasnoleninsk field producing 700 barrels of oil per day; an additional well is now being drilled.

Ownership
The significant shareholders as of November 2014 were: Limolines (27.04%), Alexander Chistyakov (17.18%), Andrey Rappoport (9.91%), Schroder Investment Management Ltd (8.88%), Henderson Global Investors Ltd (5.92%), Mastin Sberbank Capital (3.11%) and Thomas Reed (0.98%).

References

External links
Official site 

Oil and gas companies of Cyprus
British companies established in 2007
Oil and gas companies of the United Kingdom
2012 initial public offerings
Companies based in Moscow